Funding Circle is a commercial lender. Originally it was peer-to-peer lending marketplace that allows the public to lend money directly to small and medium-sized businesses.  Through this exchange businesses access lower costs of financing than they would get at a bank and the public are able to become lenders and in doing so make a return on their capital. It closed its lending option to "retail investors" between 2020 and 2022, and then announced, in March 2022, that it had made the closure permanent.

As of March 2022, Funding Circle had facilitated over £13.7 billion in loans to small and medium-sized firms. The company is listed on the London Stock Exchange.

History

2010-13; Founding 
Samir Desai, James Meekings and Andrew Mullinger, friends from University of Oxford, first discussed the idea of a peer-to-peer lending marketplace in a public house in 2008. This meeting occurred during the 2007-09 financial crisis, a period in Britain when the banks were cutting back on "lending to strengthen their balance sheets and meet regulatory demands". It was in this context that the peer-to-peer lending industry grew rapidly in Britain by providing a needed alternative source of capital.

In 2009 Desai, Meekings and Mullinger quit their jobs to co-found the company that would be launched in August 2010 under the name Funding Circle.

In 2012 the British government used the platform to lend 20 million pounds ($32 million) to small businesses. From launching in 2010 to October 2013 Funding Circle had facilitated £160 million of loans.

2013-15; Expansion through merging & acquisition 
In 2013 Accel Partners led the $37 million round of funding along with Ribbit Capital, Union Square Ventures and Index Ventures bringing the company's total funding to $58 million to fund Funding Circle US market entry. With the $37 million round recent capital raising in October 2013 Funding Circle merged with San Francisco-based Endurance Lending Network to gain access to the US market. As a US firm Endurance Lending Network is regulated on a state-by-state basis and as of 2013 was regulated in 31 states. The Endurance Lending Network changed its name to Funding Circle, and Reuters reported: "Unlike Funding Circle, Endurance Lending's site is only open to accredited and institutional investors, due to differences in regulation".

In October 2015 Funding Circle acquired Zencap to access markets in Germany, Spain and the Netherlands. In September 2018, global asset management firm Alcentra agreed to purchase up to $1 billion worth of business loans from the Funding Circle US platform, on behalf of its clients. The loans would be financed by Credit Suisse over a period of three years and were expected to be provided to around 8,000 U.S. businesses.

2018; Initial public offering
The company was listed on the London Stock Exchange in September 2018 with an initial valuation of £1.5 billion. The company raised around £300 million in the initial public offering ('IPO'). The IPO accounted for 29.3% of the company shares. Danish billionaire and owner of Bestseller, Anders Povlsen anchored the float by agreeing to purchase a minimum of 10% of the shares. However, the shares fell 24% from the float price of 440p on the first day of trading.

2019-present; Since becoming a public company
Funding Circle reported its first financial accounts as a public company in 2019. These accounts revealed a 55% increase in year on year revenues and an increase in pre-tax losses from £36.3m to £50.7m; the increase in pre-tax losses were driven by the company spending more on marketing and staff.

In April 2019 the board of Funding Circle SME Income Fund announced that it would wind itself up and return its capital to shareholders. The company referred to a halving of revenue growth amid an "uncertain economic environment" in July 2019. The Guardian suggested was that this had been driven by Brexit rather than anything fundamentally wrong with the company's business model. Then in August 2019 it announced an increase of 15% in first half losses due to UK bad debts.

In September 2019 the Press Association noted that lenders face a near 100-day wait to sell off unwanted loans and get their money back, compared with just eight days in January 2019, reflecting a lack of liquidity in the product. In October 2019 Funding Circle wrote to investors in an effort to allay some of these concerns. Then in November 2019 the company's IPO was cited as an example of why hopes of a 2019 listings rush had been left unfulfilled.

On 9 April 2020 Funding Circle announced the temporary suspension of their secondary market for loan parts stating "we have taken the decision to pause the secondary market while we continue to evaluate the potential impact of Covid-19."

On 10 March 2022, the company announced it would be exiting the peer to peer market complete to concentrate on providing commercial loans.

Operations
Funding Circle is an online marketplace that enables investors to offer money direct to small companies. Businesses can borrow up to £1 million in the UK, up to $500,000 in the US, and up to €250,000 in Germany and the Netherlands for up to 60 months.  Initially the loan rate was set through an auction process, but since September 2015, Funding Circle determines the loan rate offered based on risk category and loan term.

Regulatory
As of 2012 Britain's Financial Services Compensation Scheme does not cover lending by crowd funding or peer-to-peer lending and therefore Funding Circle's customers are not protected and cannot turn as a last resort to the FSCS.

In December 2012 it was announced by the UK Treasury that beginning in April 2014 the UK's new Financial Conduct Authority (FCA) would regulate peer-to-peer lenders, including Funding Circle. It further announced that during 2013 there would be consultation to decide how the new rules would work.

References

Further reading

External links
 Funding Circle's website 

Peer-to-peer lending companies
Financial services companies established in 2010
Financial services companies based in the City of London
British companies established in 2010